George Johnson (born January 20, 1952) is an American journalist and science writer.

Work
Johnson is the author of nine books, including The Cancer Chronicles (2013), The Ten Most Beautiful Experiments (2008) and Strange Beauty: Murray Gell-Mann and the Revolution in 20th-Century Physics (1999), and writes for a number of publications, including The New York Times. He is a two-time winner of the science journalism award from the American Association for the Advancement of Science. His books have been short-listed three times for the Royal Society science book prize. His column, "Raw Data", appears in The New York Times.

Johnson is one of the co-hosts (with science writer John Horgan) of "Science Faction", a weekly discussion on the website Bloggingheads.tv, related to topics in science. Several prominent scientists, philosophers, and bloggers have been interviewed for the site.

Awards 
His ninth book The Cancer Chronicles: Unlocking Medicine's Deepest Mystery was on the shortlist for the 2014 Royal Society Prize for Science Books.

Previously shortlisted for the prize were Strange Beauty: Murray Gell-Mann and the Revolution in 20th-Century Physics (2001) and Fire in the Mind: Science, Faith, and the Search for Order (1995).

In 2014 three of his pieces for The New York Times about the science of cancer won the AAAS Science Journalism Award. He won the award in 2000 for three articles about complexity and high-energy physics.

Bibliography

 The Cancer Chronicles: Unlocking Medicine's Deepest Mystery. Knopf, 2013.
 The Ten Most Beautiful Experiments. Knopf, 2008.
 Miss Leavitt's Stars: The Untold Story of the Woman Who Discovered How to Measure the Universe. James Atlas Books/Norton, 2005, about Henrietta Leavitt
 A Shortcut Through Time: The Path to the Quantum Computer. Knopf, 2003.
 Strange Beauty: Murray Gell-Mann and the Revolution in 20th-Century Physics. Knopf, 1999. Vintage paperback, 2000, about Murray Gell-Mann
 Fire in the Mind: Science, Faith, and the Search for Order. Knopf, 1995. Vintage paperback, 1996.
 In the Palaces of Memory: How We Build the Worlds Inside Our Heads. Knopf, 1991. Vintage paperback, 1992.
 Machinery of the Mind: Inside the New Science of Artificial Intelligence. Times Books, 1986. Tempus / Microsoft paperback, 1987.
 Architects of Fear: Conspiracy Theories and Paranoia in American Politics. Tarcher/Houghton Mifflin, 1984.

References

External links

George Johnson's home page
Interviews/Discussions on Bloggingheads.tv
New York Times author index page

1952 births
20th-century American essayists
20th-century American journalists
20th-century American male writers
20th-century American non-fiction writers
20th-century American scientists
21st-century American essayists
21st-century American journalists
21st-century American male writers
21st-century American non-fiction writers
21st-century American scientists
American bloggers
American journalists
American male essayists
American male non-fiction writers
American male writers
American science writers
American University alumni
Critics of conspiracy theories
Historians of science
Living people
The New York Times writers
People from Fayetteville, Arkansas
Philosophers of mind
Philosophers of science
Philosophers of technology
Philosophy writers
Science activists
Science communicators
Science journalists
University of New Mexico alumni
Video bloggers
Writers about activism and social change
Writers about religion and science
Writers from Arkansas
Writers from Santa Fe, New Mexico